Rudolf von Eichthal (18 March 1877 – 17 August 1974) was an Austrian writer. His work was part of the literature event in the art competition at the 1936 Summer Olympics.

References

1877 births
1974 deaths
20th-century Austrian male writers
Olympic competitors in art competitions
People from Moravská Třebová
Theresian Military Academy alumni